Richard Tardits (born July 30, 1965), is a former American football linebacker for the New England Patriots of the National Football League (NFL), and a former rugby union footballer for the United States national rugby union team. He held the record for most sacks in a career at the University of Georgia, until surpassed by David Pollack in 2004, and he was referred to as 'Le Sack' by fans because of his French birth.

Playing career 
Tardits was born in Bayonne, France. He was former player on the French junior national rugby team and a participant in the Running of the Bulls at Pamplona, he was a walk-on for the Georgia Bulldogs.  During his NFL playing days, he sponsored a semipro football team in his French hometown of Biarritz.

During his NFL career, he also helped the Mystic River Rugby Club reach the national finals.  He later represented the United States in rugby.

NFL career
Phoenix Cardinals
1989: 5th round Draft pick (123rd overall)
New England Patriots
1990: 2 G, 1 GS
1991: 16 G, 1FR
1992: 9 G
Career Totals: 27 Games, 1 Game Start, 1 Fumble Recovery

Rugby Career (USA Eagles)
Rugby World Cup
1999 (1 +1 Game)
Rugby World Cup Qualifiers
1994–1996 (3 Games, 1 Try)
Pacific Rim Championship
1996–1997 (3 Games)
1997–1998 (1 Game)
1998–1999 (5 Games)
Pan-American Championship
1996–1997 (1 Game)
Friendlies
02/10/1993 v Australia
12/03/1994 v Bermuda (1 Try)
21/05/1994 v Canada
05/11/1994 v Ireland
06/01/1996 v Ireland (1 Try)
11/01/1997 v Wales
12/04/1998 v Spain (Sub)
25/07/1998 v Fiji (Sub)
Other Club Affiliations:
French National Team (under 21)
Biarritz Olympique (France)
Mystic River Rugby Club (USA)

References 

1965 births
Living people
Sportspeople from Bayonne
French players of American football
American football linebackers
American rugby union players
French rugby union players
Georgia Bulldogs football players
New England Patriots players
United States international rugby union players
Bull runners
Footballers who switched code
Mystic River Rugby players
Rugby union players that played in the NFL
Rugby union flankers